Dalla cypselus is a species of butterfly in the family Hesperiidae. It is found in Colombia and Bolivia.

Subspecies
Dalla cypselus cypselus - Colombia
Dalla cypselus evages (Hewitson, 1877) - Bolivia

References

Butterflies described in 1867
cypselus
Hesperiidae of South America
Taxa named by Baron Cajetan von Felder
Taxa named by Rudolf Felder